Godalming Borough Hall is a municipal building in Bridge Street in Godalming, England. The building is the meeting place of Godalming Town Council.

History

The first municipal building in Godalming was an 18th-century market hall in the High Street which was used to accommodate French prisoners following the capture of Belle Île in June 1761. It was replaced by the current market hall (also known as the Pepper Pot) which was designed by John Perry in the neoclassical style, built by public subscription and completed in 1814. The design involved a symmetrical main frontage with three bays facing onto the High Street; it was arcaded on the ground floor so markets could be held with an assembly room on the first floor. The end elevations were canted so as to give an octagonal shape and at roof level there was a two-stage clock tower with a cupola for the second stage.

After civic leaders decided that the assembly room in the Pepper Pot was inadequate for public meetings, a public hall was erected in Bridge Street: it was designed by Henry Peak, built using brown rubble masonry and completed in 1861.

Following significant population growth, especially after the London and South Western Railway reached the town in 1849, the area became a municipal borough with the Pepper Pot as its town hall in 1875. In May 1907 tenders were invited from contractors to extend the public hall in Bridge Street to the west to create new municipal buildings for the borough. The extension was built in red brick with stone dressings and the work was completed in 1908. The design of the enlarged structure involved an asymmetrical main frontage with ten bays facing onto Bridge Street; the central section of three bays, which slightly projected forward, featured arcading on the ground floor, three sash windows with stone surrounds on the first floor and a pediment above with an oculus in the tympanum. The left hand section featured, in the central bay, a doorway with a canopy on the ground floor and a panel containing the borough coat of arms on the first floor. The right hand section featured, in the end bay which slightly projected forward, a round headed doorway on the ground floor and a tri-part sash window on the first floor with a pediment above.

The building continued to serve as the meeting place of Godalming Borough Council for much of the 20th century, but ceased to be the local seat of government when Waverley Borough Council was formed with its headquarters in Guildford in 1974. Waverley Council moved to new council offices in The Burys just behind the borough hall in 1980. The borough hall subsequently became the meeting place for Godalming Town Council.

Works of art in the borough hall include a portrait by Godfrey Kneller of the locally-born sailor, Admiral Sir John Balchen, who became governor of the Greenwich Naval Hospital in March 1743.

References

Government buildings completed in 1861
City and town halls in Surrey
Godalming